Carole Ann or Carole-Ann is a blended name combining Carole and Ann as a feminine given name derived from the names Karl and Hannah. Notable people referred to by this name include the following:

Given name

Known as Carole Ann or Carole-Ann
Carole Ann Boone, former wife of serial killer Ted Bundy
Carole Ann Ford (born 1940), British actress
Carole Ann Haswell British professor of astrophysics and astronomy
Carole Ann Klonarides (born 1951), American curator, video artist, writer and art consultant

Known as Carole
Carole Ann Jones, known as Carol Lynley (1942 – 2019), American actress
Carole Ann Pope, known as Carole Pope, British-born Canadian rock singer-songwriter
Carole Ann Radziwill, born Carole Ann DiFalco and known as Carole Radziwill (born 1963), American journalist, author, and reality television personality
Carole Ann Seborovski, known as Carole Seborovski (born 1960), American artist

See also

Carol Ann
Carolean (disambiguation)

Notes